Ella Guevara (born Janella Denise Yuson Guevara; August 19, 1998, Quezon City) is a Filipina child actress. She rose to fame through her appearance on a talent search on television called StarStruck Kids that aired on the Filipino television channel GMA 7. Although she did not go on to win the said competition, she has since gone on to make several television and film appearances, mostly on the same network and has proven her worth as a child actress when she won as best child actress 5 times in a row, making her one of the most popular child actresses in the Philippines.

Filmography

Television

Films

Awards
Best Child Performer of year 2004 - Metro Manila Film Festival (MMFF)
Most popular child actress 2005 (Guillermo Mendoza Memorial Foundation awards)
Best Child Actress of year 2006 (Famas Awards)
Most Popular Child Actress 2007 (Guillermo Mendoza Memorial Foundation awards)

External links
Ella Guevara and Miguel Tanfelix fanlisting
Ella Guevara at iGMA.tv

Ella Guevara's blog
Pretty Ella Guevara fansite
Sun Star Cebu article: Totally Ella!

1998 births
Filipino child actresses
Filipino film actresses
Filipino television actresses
Living people
People from Quezon City
Actresses from Metro Manila
Participants in Philippine reality television series
StarStruck Kids participants
GMA Network personalities